Jochen Bachfeld (born December 17, 1952) is a retired boxer from East Germany, who represented his native country at the 1976 Summer Olympics in Montreal, Quebec, Canada. There he won the gold medal in the welterweight division (– 67 kg) after defeating Pedro Gamarro of Venezuela in the final.

1976 Olympic results 
Below is the record of Jochen Bachfeld, an East German welterweight boxer who competed at the 1976 Montreal Olympics:

Round of 64: Defeated Ali Bahri Khomani (Iran) referee stopped contest in first round
Round of 32: Defeated Athanasios Iliadis (Greece) by decision, 5-0
Round of 16: Defeated Valeri Rachkov (Soviet Union) by decision, 4-1
Quarterfinal: Defeated Carmen Rinke (Canada) by decision, 5-0
Semifinal: Defeated Victor Zilberman (Romania) by decision, 3-2
Final: Defeated Pedro Gamarro (Venezuela) by decision, 3-2 (won gold medal)

References
 
 

1952 births
Living people
Welterweight boxers
Boxers at the 1972 Summer Olympics
Boxers at the 1976 Summer Olympics
Olympic boxers of East Germany
Olympic gold medalists for East Germany
Olympic medalists in boxing
Medalists at the 1976 Summer Olympics
German male boxers
Recipients of the Patriotic Order of Merit in silver
People from Ludwigslust-Parchim